The 1898 Minnesota Golden Gophers football team represented the University of Minnesota in the 1898 Western Conference football season. In their first and only season under head coach Jack Minds, the Golden Gophers compiled a 4–5 record (1–2 against Western Conference opponents), finished in fifth place in the conference, and outscored their opponents by a combined total of 92 to 73.

The 1898 season for Minnesota was one of adversity, including bad weather and a mid-season injury to the team's captain. Coach Jack Minds was a fullback and kicker at the University of Pennsylvania.

On Thanksgiving Day 1898, Minnesota and Illinois played a football game for the first time in the two programs' history. A big storm had come through the previous day, but John Pillsbury (the student manager) put together a crew and worked overnight using horse-drawn plows to clear the field. The game itself was delayed several times when the ball was lost in snow drifts on the side of the field and the temperature fell to about 10 below zero when the game was called at noon. Illinois won the game 11–10.

Schedule

Personnel

Players

 Aune - guard
 Bernhagen - halfback
 Cameron - halfback
 Kienholtz - quarterback
 Nicoulin - tackle
 Otte - tackle
 Page - center
 Parry - guard
 Harry "Buz" Scandrett - captain, end, and elected captain for 1899
 Shepley - fullback
 von Schlegell - end

Staff
 Jack Minds - coach
 John Wirtensohn - trainer
 G.S. Phelps - football manager

References

Minnesota
Minnesota Golden Gophers football seasons
Gophers